

North Region

Acre
Cruzeiro do Sul - 86,725
Rio Branco (capital) - 314,127

(Est. 2006 - IBGE)

Amapá
Macapá (capital) - 368,367
Santana - 101,864

(Est. 2006 - IBGE)

Amazonas
Coari - 87,468
Itacoatiara - 81,674
Manacapuru - 84,656
Manaus (capital) - 1,688,524
Parintins - 112,636
Tefé - 71,975

(Est. 2006 - IBGE)

Pará
Abaetetuba - 133,316
Altamira - 85,649
Ananindeua - 498,095   (part of the Metropolitan Region of Belém)
Barcarena - 76,071
Belém (capital) - 1,428,368
Bragança - 103,751
Breves - 86,084
Cametá - 106,816
Castanhal - 158,462
Itaituba - 96,515
Marabá - 200,801
Marituba - 101,356   (part of the Metropolitan Region of Belém)
Paragominas - 88,877
Parauapebas - 95,225
Redenção - 72,085
Santarém - 276,074
Tucuruí - 87,602

(Est. 2006 - IBGE)

Rondônia
Ariquemes - 86,924
Cacoal - 76,422
Ji-Paraná - 113,453
Porto Velho (capital) - 380,974

(Est. 2006 - IBGE)

Roraima
Boa Vista (capital) - 249,655

(Est. 2006 - IBGE)

Tocantins
Araguaína - 130,105
Gurupi - 72,831
Palmas (capital) - 220,889

(Est. 2006 - IBGE)

Northeast Region

Alagoas
Arapiraca - 202,390
Maceió (capital) - 922,458
Palmeira dos Índios - 69,466 (2005)
Penedo - 59,968 (2005)
União dos Palmares - 59,365 (2005)

(Est. 2006 - IBGE)

Bahia
Alagoinhas - 139,723
Barreiras - 137,794
Camaçari - 196,798  (part of the Metropolitan Region of Salvador)
Eunápolis - 94,020
Feira de Santana - 535,284
Guanambi - 76,203
Ilhéus - 220,943
Itabuna - 204,988
Jacobina - 76,473
Jequié - 148,974
Juazeiro - 207,969
Lauro de Freitas - 145,831  (part of the Metropolitan Region of Salvador)
Paulo Afonso - 103,705
Porto Seguro - 140,252
Salvador (capital) - 2,711,372
Santo Antônio de Jesus - 86,876
Serrinha - 75,500
Simões Filho - 109,775  (part of the Metropolitan Region of Salvador)
Teixeira de Freitas - 123,399
Valença - 85,224
Vitória da Conquista - 289,772

(Est. 2006 - IBGE)

Ceará
Aquiraz - 70,398
Canindé - 75,347
Caucaia - 313,584   (part of the Metropolitan Region of Fortaleza)
Crateús - 74,036
Crato - 115,087
Fortaleza (capital) - 2,416,920
Iguatu - 92,981
Itapipoca - 107,012
Juazeiro do Norte - 240,638
Maracanaú - 196,422   (part of the Metropolitan Region of Fortaleza)
Maranguape - 100,279   (part of the Metropolitan Region of Fortaleza)
Quixadá - 75,717
Sobral - 175,814

(Est. 2006 - IBGE)

Maranhão
Açailândia - 106,357
Bacabal - 96,883
Balsas - 73,848
Barra do Corda - 78,497
Caxias - 144,387
Codó - 115,098
Imperatriz - 232,560
Pinheiro - 73,502
Santa Inês - 76,173
Santa Luzia - 82,854
São José de Ribamar - 134,593   (part of the Metropolitan Region of São Luís)
São Luís (capital) - 998,385
Timon - 146,139

(Est. 2006 - IBGE)

Paraíba
Campina Grande - 379,871
Bayeux - 95,004 (part of the Metropolitan Region of João Pessoa)
João Pessoa (capital) - 672,081
Patos - 99,494
Santa Rita - 131,684 (part of the Metropolitan Region of João Pessoa)

(Est. 2006 - IBGE)

Pernambuco
Abreu e Lima - 97,911 (part of the Metropolitan Region of Recife
Araripina - 78,520
Belo Jardim - 74,640
Cabo de Santo Agostinho - 172,150 (part of the Metropolitan Region of Recife)
Camaragibe - 150,354 (part of the Metropolitan Region of Recife)
Carpina - 70,337
Caruaru - 283,152
Garanhuns - 128,398
Goiana - 76,371
Gravatá - 71,551
Igarassu - 92,455 (part of the Metropolitan Region of Recife)
Jaboatão dos Guararapes - 651,355 (part of the Metropolitan Region of Recife)
Olinda - 387,494 (part of the Metropolitan Region of Recife)
Paulista - 299,744 (part of the Metropolitan Region of Recife)
Petrolina - 260,004
Recife (capital) - 1,515,052
Santa Cruz do Capibaribe - 74,359
São Lourenço da Mata - 93,758 (part of the Metropolitan Region of Recife)
Vitória de Santo Antão - 125,563

(Est. 2006 - IBGE)

Piauí
Parnaíba - 143,675
Picos - 71,825
Teresina (capital) - 801,971

(Est. 2006 - IBGE)

Rio Grande do Norte
Ceará-Mirim - 70,012
Mossoró - 229,787
Natal (capital) - 789,896
Parnamirim - 170,055   (part of the Metropolitan Region of Natal)
São Gonçalo do Amarante - 87,493   (part of the Metropolitan Region of Natal)

(Est. 2006 - IBGE)

Sergipe
Aracaju (capital) - 505,286
Itabaiana - 85,664
Lagarto - 91,605
Nossa Senhora do Socorro - 179,060
São Cristóvão - 77,278

Center-West Region

Distrito Federal
Brasília (Brazilian National Capital)

Goiás
Anápolis
Novo Gama
Goiânia (capital)
Valparaíso de Goiás
Luziânia
Rio Verde
Águas Lindas de Goiás
Trindade
Aparecida de Goiânia
Formosa

Mato Grosso
Cuiabá (capital) - 585,367
Várzea Grande - 271,339
Rondonópolis - 218,899
Sinop - 132,934
Tangará da Serra - 96,932
Cáceres - 90,881
Sorriso - 82,792
Lucas do Rio Verde - 59,436

(Est. 2016 - IBGE)

Mato Grosso do Sul
Aquidauana - 46,469
Campo Grande (capital) - 765,247
Corumbá - 101,089
Dourados - 186,317
Três Lagoas - 87,113
Ponta Porã - 68,317

Southeast Region

Espírito Santo
Aracruz
Cachoeiro de Itapemirim
Cariacica
Colatina
Guarapari
Linhares
Vila Velha (state's largest)
São Mateus
Serra
Vitória (capital)

Minas Gerais
Barbacena
Betim
Belo Horizonte (capital)
Conselheiro Lafaiete
Contagem
Diamantina
Divinópolis
Governador Valadares
Ipatinga
Itabira
Itajubá
Juiz de Fora
Montes Claros
Ouro Preto
Patos de Minas
Poços de Caldas
Pouso Alegre
Ribeirão das Neves
Sete Lagoas
Uberaba
Uberlândia
Varginha

Rio de Janeiro
Angra dos Reis
Barra Mansa
Belford Roxo
Cabo Frio
Duque de Caxias
Macaé
Magé
Niterói
Nova Friburgo
Nova Iguaçu
Paraty
Petrópolis
Resende
Rio de Janeiro (capital)
São Gonçalo
Teresópolis
Volta Redonda

São Paulo
Americana
Araraquara
Atibaia
Barretos
Bauru
Bebedouro
Campinas
Campos do Jordão
Caçapava
Catanduva
Cubatão
Diadema
Franca
Guarujá
Guarulhos
Hortolândia
Indaiatuba
Itapeva
Itatiba
Itu
Jacareí
Jaú
Jundiaí
Limeira
Marília
Mauá
Mirassol
Mogi das Cruzes
Poá
Osasco
Ourinhos
Piracicaba
Praia Grande
Presidente Prudente
Registro
Ribeirão Preto
Salto
Santos
Santo André
São Bernardo do Campo
São Caetano do Sul
São Carlos
São João da Boa Vista
São José dos Campos
São José do Rio Preto
São Paulo (capital)
São Vicente
Sorocaba
Sumaré
Taboão da Serra
Taubaté

South Region

Paraná
Cascavel - 286,345
Colombo - 232,860
Curitiba (capital) - 1,797,678
Foz do Iguaçu - 311,940
Guarapuava - 169,450
Londrina - 496,780
Maringá - 324,578
Paranaguá - 147,894
Ponta Grossa - 305,890
São José dos Pinhais - 261,376

Santa Catarina
Blumenau
Chapecó
Criciúma
Florianópolis (capital)
Jaraguá do Sul
Joinville (state's largest)
Lages
São José
Balneário Camboriú
Itajaí
Palhoça
Tubarão

Rio Grande do Sul
Bagé
Canoas
Caxias do Sul
Erechim
Gravataí
Novo Hamburgo
Pelotas
Passo Fundo
Porto Alegre (capital)
Rio Grande
Santa Cruz do Sul
Santa Maria
Santana do Livramento
São Leopoldo

See also

List of cities in Brazil
List of largest cities in Brazil
Largest metropolitan areas in the Americas
Brazilian Institute of Geography and Statistics

Largest cities
Brazil